Tito Goya (real name Andrew Butler) (April 4, 1951 – December 1, 1985) was a Puerto Rican actor known for his portrayal of "Cupcake" in the 1977 film Short Eyes.

Goya appeared in Marathon Man (1976), Andy Warhol's Bad (1977), All That Jazz (1979), Going in Style (1979), Night of the Juggler (1980) and Fort Apache, The Bronx (1981).  His final acting appearance was on Miami Vice (1984) as Carlos Mendez, a drug-dealer's liaison. Goya grew up in Brentwood, New York with his mother Carmen, stepfather Mario, his brothers, Jacob,Hector, Charlie,Richard & his sister Milagros. Goya was arrested in 1984 for a murder that occurred in Austin in 1978. In 1985, Goya died of liver disease while free on bond pending trial in Texas. Goya is buried on Long Island NY.

Filmography

References

External links

1951 births
1985 deaths
American male film actors
20th-century American male actors
Deaths from liver disease